FC VPS Kharkiv was a football club from Kharkiv that represented the Kharkiv Institute of the Air Force. The abbreviation stands for Air Force.

In 1949 the club won the Cup of the Ukrainian SSR.

External links
 High level of amateurs. Football Federation of Ukraine.
 1949 Cup of the Ukrainian SSR. Luhansk Football portal.

University and college football clubs in the Soviet Union
University and college football clubs in Ukraine
Defunct football clubs in the Soviet Union
Defunct football clubs in Ukraine
VPS Kharkiv
Ivan Kozhedub National Air Force University